The 1995 European Weightlifting Championships were held at the Torwar Hall in Warsaw, Poland from May 2 to May 7, 1995. It was the 74th edition of the men's event. There were a total number of 180 athletes competing, from 32 nations. The women competition were held in Beersheba, Israel. It was the 8th event for the women.

Medal overview

Men

Medals tables 
Ranking by "Big" (Total result) medals

References
Weightlifting Database

European Weightlifting Championships
European Weightlifting Championships
European Weightlifting Championships
International weightlifting competitions hosted by Poland
Sports competitions in Warsaw
1990s in Warsaw
May 1995 sports events in Europe